The Party for Economic Development and Solidarity (PDES) is a political party in Mali led by Hamed Diané Séméga.

History
The party was established on 17 July 2010 by supporters of President Amadou Toumani Touré, and officially registered on 14 September. The party's Vice-President Jamille Bittar was its candidate in the 2013 presidential elections. He finished ninth in the first round.

In the 2013 parliamentary elections it won three seats.

References

External links
Facebook page

Political parties in Mali
Political parties established in 2010
2010 establishments in Africa